Eyal Zamir is a major general in Israel Defense Forces. He was the Deputy Chief of Staff from December 2018 and was replaced by Herzi Halevi in July 2021.

He was the commander of the Southern Command, Military Secretary to the Prime Minister, commander of the 36th Division and commander of the 7th Armored Brigade.

On the 2nd January 2023 he was appointed director general of the Ministry of Defense by Yoav Galant

Biography 
Zamir was born and raised in Eilat on January 26, 1966. He is a graduate of the 17th class of The Military Academy for Command in Tel Aviv. 

Zamir was drafted into the IDF and was enlisted in the Armored Corps in 1984. In the Armored Corps he underwent training as a combat soldier and later attended the tank commander course. He completed an armored officers course and was a platoon commander and company commander in the 500th Brigade and the 460th Brigade.

In the years 1992-1994 he served as the operations officer of the 7th Armored Brigade (with the rank of major). From 1994 to 1996 he served as the commander of the 75th Battalion in the 7th Brigade (with the rank of Lieutenant Colonel). In 1996, he was a commander of the tank commanders course at the armored school. He served in this position until 1997, when he went on to study for a year at the War School in France.

In the years 1998-2000 he served as an operations officer of the 162nd Division. In the years 2000–2002, he was head of the Armored Corps Theory Department at the headquarters of the Chief Armored Officer, and at the same time served as commander of the 656th Brigade, a reserve division in the Central Command (with the rank of colonel). In the years 2002–2003, he was commander of the Tactical Training Center at the National Training Center on land, in parallel with his role as commander of the reserve division.

In the years 2003–2005 he was commander of the 7th Armored Brigade. In the years 2007–2009 he served as commander of the 143rd Division (with the rank of brigadier general), and at the same time commanded a course for company commanders and battalion commanders.

In June 2009, he was appointed commander of the 36th Division. In July 2011 he was replaced by Tamir Heyman.

In November 2012, he was appointed the Prime Minister's Military Secretary. On September 3, 2015, he ended his term as the Prime Minister's military secretary. On October 14, 2015, he took office as Commander of the Southern Command. Towards the end of his term, clashes began on the Israel-Gaza Strip border. On June 6, 2018, he ended his term as Commander of the Southern Command.

On December 13, 2018, he was appointed Deputy Chief of Staff, a position he held until July 11, 2021.

On June 13, 2022  Minister of Defense Benny Gantz commenced the process of selecting Israel's 23rd IDF Chief of Staff. Zamir was announced as one of 3 candidates along with Herzi Halevi and Yoel Strick. On July 17th, 2022 Gantz announced that the race is between Zamir and Halevi.

Education 
Zamir is a graduate of the Inter-Armed College of Command and Staff, and from the National Security College, with a bachelor's degree in political science from the University of Haifa.

Awards and decorations 
Eyal Zamir was awarded two campaign ribbons for his service during two wars.

References

1966 births
Israeli generals
Living people
Israeli military personnel
University of Haifa alumni